Lord Hughes may refer to:
William Hughes, Baron Hughes (1911–1999), British Labour Party politician
Robert Hughes, Baron Hughes of Woodside (born 1932), British Labour Party politician
Anthony Hughes, Lord Hughes of Ombersley (born 1948), former English judge of the Supreme Court of the United Kingdom